Enzklösterle is a municipality in the district of Calw in Baden-Württemberg, Germany.

History
Enzklösterle was first mentioned in a document from 1323 as "Klösterlein ze der Entz". It became a possession of the County of Württemberg between the years 1323 and 1345. In 1599, the Duke of Württemberg established an managed forest in Enzklösterle, which would have a lasting impact on the region's economy. The village of Enztal was incorporated into Enzklösterle in 1935, forming the present boundaries of the municipality. Oberamt Neuenbürg was dissolved in 1938 and Enzklösterle was subsequently assigned to the district of Calw.

Geography
The municipality (Gemeinde) of Enzklösterle is situated on the western edge of the district of Calw, along the border with the districts of Freudenstadt and Rastatt to the west. Enzklösterle is physically located in the valley of the Großen Enz, in the Northern Black Forest and Grinde regions. Elevation above sea level in the municipal area ranges from a high of  Normalnull (NN) at the top of the Hirschkopf to a low of  NN.

Politics
Enzklösterle has one borough (Ortsteil), Enzklösterle, eight villages – Gompelscheuer, Hetschelhof, Lappach, Mittelenztal, Petersmühle, Poppeltal, Rohnbuch, and Süßbächle – and the industrial district of Enztal. The abandoned villages of Birkenäckerle, Boppelseehaus, Kaltbronn, and Zwickgabel are also located in the municipal area.

Coat of arms
Enzklösterle's coat of arms shows a yellow raft upon a blue, wavy bend dexter over a field of yellow. The raft is a reference to Enzklösterle's history of forestry, and the wavy bend the river Enz. This coat of arms was issued on 25 May 1950 by the provisional post-WWII Württemberg-Hohenzollern government.

Transportation

References

Calw (district)